Easy Beat is the second studio album by Dr. Dog. It was released March 15, 2005 on CD and vinyl. It was the first release on Park the Van Records, as well as the band's first official release on a record label.

Recording
The album was written and recorded entirely with 1/4-inch eight track tape at Dr. Dog's home studio.

Track listing

Personnel 

Brendan Cooney – string arrangements
Dr. Dog – engineer
Andrew Jones – guitar
Toby Leaman – bass, vocals
Dimitri Manos – drums (track 5)
Scott McMicken – guitar, vocals
Zach Miller – keyboard
Jesse Moynihan – violin
Bill Moriarty – mixing
Juston Stens – drums, vocals
Uncle Mark – bowed bass
Steven Vertel – mastering

References

Dr. Dog albums
2005 albums